Kjell Schneider (born October 4, 1976 in Kiel) is a beach volleyball player from Germany, who won the bronze medal in the men's beach team competition at the 2005 Beach Volleyball World Championships in Berlin, Germany, partnering Julius Brink.

References
 

1976 births
Living people
German men's beach volleyball players
Sportspeople from Kiel